Úbeda Club de Fútbol was a Spanish football team based in Úbeda, Jaén, in the autonomous community of Andalusia. Founded in 1923 and dissolved in 2006, they played in the Tercera División for 33 seasons, and held home matches at Campo de Fútbol de San Miguel, with a capacity of 6,000 people.

History
Founded in 1923 as Úbeda Football Club, the club changed name in 1941 to Úbeda Club de Fútbol due to the determinations of the government after the Spanish Civil War. They first reached the Tercera División in 1952, playing in the category for seven consecutive seasons before suffering relegation and subsequently folding in 1959.

Úbeda only returned to an active status in 1972, and achieved promotion to the third division in 1977. Until 2006, the club only played three of the 30 seasons in the Regional Preferente, being a long-standing member of the Tercera División. 

Under severe economic problems at the time of their relegation in 2006, Úbeda withdrew from the 2006–07 Primera Andaluza, disappearing afterwards. Other clubs were founded in the city, such as CD Úbeda Viva and UD Úbeda CF, with the goal of reviving Úbeda CF's history. The latter folded in March 2020, after less than two months of existence.

Season to season

33 seasons in Tercera División

References

External links
La Preferente team profile 

Defunct football clubs in Andalusia
Association football clubs established in 1923
Association football clubs disestablished in 2006
1923 establishments in Spain
2006 disestablishments in Spain